Kempville is an unincorporated community in Richmond Township in Berks County, Pennsylvania, United States. Kempville is located along U.S. Route 222, southwest of the southern end of the Kutztown Bypass.

References

Unincorporated communities in Berks County, Pennsylvania
Unincorporated communities in Pennsylvania